Holiday Home Makeover with Mr. Christmas is a 2020 American television series about holiday home makeover. It was released on November 18, 2020, on Netflix.

Cast 
 Benjamin Bradley

Episodes

References

External links
 
 

2020 American television series debuts
English-language Netflix original programming